The Wrath is a 2018 South Korean horror mystery film directed by Yoo Young-sun, starring Seo Young-hee and Son Na-eun. It is a remake of the 1986 Korean horror film Woman's Wail. The film was released on November 8, 2018.

Premise
Set during the Joseon Era, the story follows two Joseon women against each other when a tragedy befalls a family of three sons who all die on their wedding day.

Cast
Seo Young-hee as Lady Shin
Son Na-eun as Ok-bun 
Park Min-ji as Wol-ah
Lee Tae-ri
Son Seong-yoon as Kyung-ran 
Park Min-jung as Mrs. Han
Lee Jae-ah as Young-sook
Choi Hong-il
Kim Hee-sang

Production
Principal photography began on December 20, 2017, and wrapped up in early 2018. Actress Park Jin-hee was first offered to play lead female role Lady Shin, but declined later.

Release
The film has been sold to 20 countries as of October 30, 2018.
 Singapore: December 6, 2018
 Vietnam: January 25, 2019
 Thailand: November 29, 2018

References

External links
 
 
 

2018 films
2018 horror films
Horror film remakes
Films set in the Joseon dynasty
2010s Korean-language films
2010s mystery horror films
Mystery horror films
South Korean horror films
South Korean mystery films
Remakes of South Korean films
South Korean historical films
2010s South Korean films